Petrophila santafealis is a moth in the family Crambidae. It was described by John B. Heppner in 1976. It is found in North America, where it has been recorded from Arizona and Florida.

The length of the forewings is 5.2–7 mm for males and 6.5–9 mm for females. Adults have been recorded on wing year round.

The larvae are aquatic and feed on algae.

Etymology
It is named for Florida's Santa Fe River, the type location.

References

Petrophila
Moths described in 1976